Arkeith Lamonte Brown, Jr. (born May 1, 1986) is an American football defensive back who is currently a free agent. He played college football at Texas A&M University and attended El Campo High School in El Campo, Texas. He has also been a member of the Green Bay Blizzard, Hartford Colonials and Baltimore Brigade.

College career
Brown played for the Texas A&M Aggies from 2005 to 2008.

Professional career
Brown was rated the 55th best cornerback in the 2009 NFL Draft by NFLDraftScout.com.

Brown attended New Orleans Saints rookie mini-camp on a tryout basis in 2009.

Green Bay Blizzard
Brown played for the Green Bay Blizzard of the Indoor Football League (IFL) in 2011. He earned First Team All-IFL honors, was named Defensive Rookie of the Year and led the league in interceptions with 12. He also recorded 67 total tackles and 23 pass break-ups.

Hartford Colonials
Brown spent time with the Hartford Colonials of the United Football League in 2011.

Arizona Rattlers
Brown signed with the Arizona Rattlers of the AFL on September 28, 2011. He was named Second-Team All-Arena as a rookie after recording 83.5 tackles, 21 pass breakups and 10 interceptions in 2012. He was named Defensive Player of the Game for ArenaBowl XXV. Brown earned Second Team All-Arena honors for the second consecutive year after totaling 79.5 tackles and eight interceptions in 18 games for the Rattlers in 2013. He recorded a career-high 90.5 tackles to go along with five interceptions in 17 games in 2014. On July 8, 2017, the Rattlers defeated the Sioux Falls Storm in the United Bowl by a score of 50–41. He was released by the  Rattlers on October 6, 2017.

Baltimore Brigade
Brown was assigned to the Baltimore Brigade on August 2, 2017.

Arizona Rattlers
Brown was signed by the Rattlers on February 2, 2018, released on February 8 and signed on February 13, 2018.

Albany Empire
On July 19, 2018, Brown was assigned to the Albany Empire.

References

External links
Just Sports Stats
College Stats

Living people
1986 births
Players of American football from Texas
American football defensive backs
African-American players of American football
Texas A&M Aggies football players
Green Bay Blizzard players
Arizona Rattlers players
Baltimore Brigade players
Albany Empire (AFL) players
Sportspeople from Galveston, Texas
People from El Campo, Texas
21st-century African-American sportspeople
20th-century African-American people